

Seeds
A champion seed is indicated in bold text while text in italics indicates the round in which that seed was eliminated.

  Rod Laver (first round)
  Ken Rosewall (quarterfinals)
  Arthur Ashe (champion)
  Tom Okker (first round)
  Cliff Richey (second round)
  Andrés Gimeno (second round)
  Roy Emerson (second round)
  Pancho Gonzales (quarterfinals)

Draw

 NB: The Semifinals and Final were the best of 5 sets while all other rounds were the best of 3 sets.

Final

Section 1

Section 2

External links
 1970 Paris Open draw

Singles